Adam Hall (born 1980) is an American ice hockey player.

Adam Hall may also refer to:
 Adam Hall (alpine skier) (born 1987), New Zealand alpine skier
 Adam Duvå Hall, Danish radio and TV personality
 Adam Hall (badminton) (born 1996), Scottish badminton player
 Adam Hall, pseudonym of Elleston Trevor (1920–1995), British novelist and playwright